The 2009 Antonio Savoldi–Marco Cò – Trofeo Dimmidisì was a professional tennis tournament played on outdoor red clay courts. It was the eleventh edition of the tournament which was part of the 2009 ATP Challenger Tour. It took place in Manerbio, Italy between 24 and 30 August 2009.

ATP entrants

Seeds

 Rankings are as of August 17, 2009.

Other entrants
The following players received wildcards into the singles main draw:
  Daniele Giorgini
  Laurynas Grigelis
  Filip Tomanić
  Matteo Trevisan

The following players received wildcards into the singles main draw:
  Pedro Clar-Rosselló
  Philipp Oswald

The following players received entry from the qualifying draw:
  Carlos Berlocq
  Federico del Bonis
  Stefano Ianni
  Leonardo Tavares

Champions

Singles

 Federico del Bonis def.  Leonardo Tavares, 6–1, 6–3

Doubles

 Alessio di Mauro /  Simone Vagnozzi def.  Yves Allegro /  Jesse Huta Galung, 6–4, 3–6, [10–4]

External links
Official site
ITF Search 

Antonio Savoldi-Marco Co - Trofeo Dimmidisi
Antonio Savoldi–Marco Cò – Trofeo Dimmidisì
2009 in Italian tennis